Sekhar Puli is an Indian-American executive, philanthropist and government official. He currently serves as the president and chief executive officerof ArchLynk. Puli is the former chief executive officer of REAN Cloud and the founder of Asha-Jyothi Foundation.

Career and education 
Puli is a graduate of George Mason University and Georgetown University. Puli founded REAN Cloud, an IT service management company, in 2013, alongside Sri Vasireddy. In July 2018, Hitachi Vantara announced their plans to acquire REAN Cloud for an undisclosed sum. The acquisition was completed October 2018.

In February 2019, Puli announced that he was leaving REAN Cloud to join JanaSena party as chairman. In September 2020, AgroWave announced a funding round from Puli worth $500,000.

Puli currently serves on boards of several companies including Nucon Aerospace, TopBloc, PixelMedia, AIGO.AI, and Agrowave, along with serving as a co-founder, president and chief executive officer CEO of LifeVoxel.AI.

Philanthropy 
Puli is the founder and director of Asha-Jyothi Foundation, a non-profit organization based in Virginia. In 2019, Puli made a $2 million donation to construct an Innovation Lab for Fairfax High School.

References 

George Mason University alumni
Living people
American politicians of Indian descent
American philanthropists
1973 births